Mollie Elizabeth Holman  (18 June 1930 – 20 August 2010)  was an Australian physiologist whose work focused on muscles and the central nervous system.

Personal life 
Mollie Holman was born on 18 June 1930 in Launceston, Tasmania, Australia.

Daughter of an influential father William, a physician and radiologist and of homemaker mother Mollie (née Bain), Professor Holman was raised as one of four girls. Her father was very supportive of each daughter's intellectual development, and sparked and supported Mollie's interest in physics.

Holman died on 20 August 2010. She is survived by her sisters Jill, Joan and Lucie and their families.

Education 
Holman completed a Bachelor of Science (BSc) degree at the University of Melbourne in 1952 and a Master of Science (MSc) in 1955. She then moved to England where she undertook studies at the University of Oxford, completing a doctorate in pharmacology in 1957. She received Doctor of Science (DSc) from Monash University in the 1960s.

Working life 

1953–54 – Demonstrator in Pharmacology at the University of Melbourne-
1955–57 – Research student at the University of Oxford, on a University of Melbourne Travelling Scholarship
1957 – Wellcome Research Grant in Oxford
1958–62 – Lecturer in Physiology at the University of Melbourne
1962 – Senior Lecturer in Physiology at the University of Melbourne
1963 – Senior Lecturer in Physiology at Monash University
1965 – Edgeworth David Medal received from the Royal Society of New South Wales
1965-7? – Career position – Reader in Physiology at Monash University
1970 – Fellow of the Australian Academy of Science (FAA)
1970–96 – Professor at Monash University
1996 – Emeritus Professor at Monash University

Research 
Professor Holman's research focused on the complex network of nerve cells that regulate autonomic movements (such as digestion and blood pressure), and how these interact with smooth muscle in the body.

In a successful collaboration with Geoff Burnstock, Mollie showed how nerves initiated smooth muscle contractions. She often worked late at night to avoid the unwanted vibrations from the rumblings of passing daytime traffic that interfered with her fine electrodes. Holman completed her DPhil degree in 1957 and returned to Australia in 1958. At about the same time Burnstock was appointed to the department of zoology, allowing the collaboration to continue. Their work on smooth muscle and its nerve supply was pioneering. A series of papers was published, beginning with a note to Nature magazine in 1960. This brought Mollie to the attention of the scientific community.

Sample paper from Google Scholar: [HTML] Two types of neurones in the myenteric plexus of duodenum in the guinea-pig
GDS Hirst, ME Holman, I Spence – The Journal of Physiology, 1974 – Physiological Soc

Other interests 
Mollie had a rich social life and many interests (ranging from roller-skating, as a child, to skiing and travel, as an adult) she applied herself after retirement to a range of tasks including learning about computers.

Awards 
1965 – Edgeworth David Medal received from the Royal Society of New South Wales
1998 – Officer of the Order of Australia (AO) "for service to scientific research, particularly relating to the autonomic nervous system and the control of smooth muscle, and to education and university administration".
2001 – Centenary Medal "for service to Australian society and science".

The Mollie Holman Medal 
Monash University offered for the first time in 1998, up to 10 medals for award to doctoral candidates, normally one from each faculty, who have fulfilled their degree requirements and presented their faculty's best thesis of the year.

Notable recipients
Notable recipients include:

 Adrian Martin, Faculty of Arts, Design and Architecture
 Greer Honeywill, Faculty of Arts, Design and Architecture
 Jared Purton, Faculty of Medicine, Nursing and Health Sciences
 David Chesworth, Faculty of Arts, Design and Architecture
 David Wood (mathematician), Faculty of Information Technology
Helen Johnson (artist), Faculty of Arts, Design and Architecture

References

External links 
 Photo of Mollie Holman
 
 Farewell to Mollie Holman – Monash University Website
 Mollie Holman Medal – Monash University Website
 

1930 births
2010 deaths
Australian physiologists
Women physiologists
Australian women scientists
Officers of the Order of Australia
Fellows of the Australian Academy of Science
University of Melbourne alumni
Monash University alumni
Academic staff of the University of Melbourne
University of Melbourne women
Academic staff of Monash University
20th-century women scientists